Shandong Women's University is a women's university in Jinan, Shandong.

It was founded in 1952. The number of students in 2022 is 16588. It offers 44 majors.

References

External links
 Shandong Women's University 

Universities and colleges in Jinan
Women's universities and colleges in China